Kahlil Whitney (born January 8, 2001) is an American professional basketball player who last played for the Rio Grande Valley Vipers of the NBA G League. He played college basketball for the Kentucky Wildcats.

High school career
Whitney attended Eric Solorio Academy High School for his freshman year. Following his freshman year, Whitney transferred to Roselle Catholic High School in Roselle, New Jersey for the remainder of his high school career. As a senior, Whitney averaged 19.4 points, 5.7 rebounds, 1.8 assists and 1.1 steals per game and led Roselle Catholic to a 28–4 record. He was named a  McDonald's All-American and was named co-MVP of the Iverson Classic after scoring a game-high 38 points.

Recruiting
On August 10, 2018, Whitney committed to play at the University of Kentucky.

College career
In his second game at Kentucky, a 91–49 win over Eastern Kentucky, Whitney scored 11 points. He averaged 3.3 points and 1.7 rebounds per game at Kentucky. On January 24, 2020, in the middle of his freshman season, Whitney announced that he would be leaving the University of Kentucky. Whitney declared for the 2020 NBA draft and hired an agent.

Professional career

Greensboro Swarm (2021)
After going undrafted in the 2020 NBA draft, Whitney signed an Exhibit 10 deal with the Charlotte Hornets. He was waived at the end of training camp and added to the roster of the Hornets' NBA G League affiliate, the Greensboro Swarm. Whitney averaged 3.0 points and 1.3 rebounds per game for the Swarm.

Rio Grande Valley Vipers (2021–2022)
In October 2021, Whitney joined the Rio Grande Valley Vipers after being acquired in a trade.

Newfoundland Growlers (2022)
On April 21, 2022, Whitney signed with the Newfoundland Growlers of the CEBL.

Return to Rio Grande Valley (2022–2023)
On November 3, 2022, Whitney was named to the opening night roster for the Rio Grande Valley Vipers. On January 28, 2023, Whitney was waived.

Career statistics

College

|-
| style="text-align:left;"| 2019–20
| style="text-align:left;"| Kentucky
| 18 || 8 || 12.8 || .371 || .250 || .435 || 1.7 || .4 || .3 || .2 || 3.3

References

External links
Kentucky Wildcats bio

2001 births
Living people
American expatriate basketball people in Canada
American men's basketball players
Basketball players from Chicago
Greensboro Swarm players
Kentucky Wildcats men's basketball players
McDonald's High School All-Americans
Rio Grande Valley Vipers players
Small forwards